The 2021 Sandwell Metropolitan Borough Council election took place on 6 May 2021 to elect members of the Sandwell Metropolitan Borough Council in England. It coincided with other local elections across the United Kingdom. One-third of the seats were up for election, with three wards (Old Warley, Rowley, and Wednesbury South) electing two councillors.

Results

Ward results

Abbey

Blackheath

Bristnall

Charlemont with Grove Vale

Cradley Heath and Old Hill

Friar Park

Great Barr with Yew Tree

Great Bridge

Greets Green and Lyng

Hateley Heath

Langley

Newton

Old Warley

Oldbury

Princes End

Rowley

Smethwick

Soho and Victoria

St. Paul's

Tipton Green

Tividale

Wednesbury North

Wednesbury South

West Bromwich Central

By-elections

Tividale

References 

Sandwell
Sandwell Council elections